Mendo de Alpoim (c.1360-14?) was a Portuguese nobleman, chancellor and ambassador, member of the court of John I of Portugal. He served in diplomatic missions in the Kingdom of England.

Biography 

Mendo de Alpoim possibly born in Coimbra, son of Gomes de Alpoim and Elvira Guterres. He was married to Guiomar de Vera, daughter of Alvaro de Vera, alcaide-mór of Évora. Alpoim was the father of Lopo de Alpoim, alcaide of Montemor-o-Velho. And grandson of Diniz d' Alpoim, Lord of Esgueira. 

In 1386, he was commissioned carry out the preparations concerning the wedding of King John I with Philippa of Lancaster.

References

External links 
www.myheritage.com
purl.pt
Nobiliário de familias de Portugal (ALPUINS)

1370 births
1400s deaths
Portuguese nobility
People from Coimbra
14th-century Portuguese people
15th-century Portuguese people